Bachana Arabuli (born 5 January 1994) is a Georgian professional footballer who plays as a striker for A-League club Macarthur FC.

Club career
Arabuli made his professional debut for Dila Gori on 30 March 2013 in a match against FC Zugdidi. He has spent six months in Spain where he played for AD Alcorcón's B team in the Tercera Division. He also played for Georgian clubs Tskhinvali, 
Dinamo Tbilisi and Samtredia and for Hungarian clubs Balmazújváros and Puskás Akadémia.

Panionios
On 18 July 2019, Arabuli signed a three-year contract with Greek Super League club Panionios, who began the season on  because of financial irregularities. Arabuli scored his first goal for the club in added time in an opening-day defeat at home to newly promoted Volos. He scored a stoppage-time equaliser on 22 September away to Lamia, and on 10 November, he scored both Panionios goals in the team's second win of the campaign, 2–1 away to Xanthi. On 30 November 2019, he scored again in an emphatic 3-0 win against Panetolikos.

Lamia
On 22 September 2020, he joined Lamia on a free transfer.

Macarthur FC
On 1 September 2022, Bachana joined Macarthur FC on a free transfer. He made his debut coming off the bench on 13 November 2022, and got the game winning assist against the Central Coast Mariners in the 95th minute. Bachana scored his first A-League goal on the 18th of December 2022, scoring the winning goal against Perth Glory in the 70th minute of a 1-0 victory.

International career
Arabuli made his debut for the national team in a friendly game against Uzbekistan on 23 January 2017.

Club statistics

Updated to games played as of 21 March 2021.

Honours
Dila Gori
Erovnuli Liga runner up: 2012–13
Georgian Super Cup runner up: 2012–13

Dinamo Tbilisi
Erovnuli Liga winner: 2015–16
David Kipiani Cup winner: 2015–16
Georgian Super Cup winner: 2015–16

Samtredia
Erovnuli Liga winner: 2016

References

External links
  
 
 

Living people
1994 births
Footballers from Tbilisi
Association football forwards
Footballers from Georgia (country)
Georgia (country) international footballers
Georgia (country) under-21 international footballers
FC Dila Gori players
FC Dinamo Tbilisi players
FC Samtredia players
FC Spartaki Tskhinvali players
Balmazújvárosi FC players
Puskás Akadémia FC players
Panionios F.C. players
PAS Lamia 1964 players
Macarthur FC players
Erovnuli Liga players
Nemzeti Bajnokság I players
Super League Greece players
Expatriate footballers from Georgia (country)
Expatriate footballers in Hungary
Expatriate sportspeople from Georgia (country) in Hungary
Expatriate sportspeople from Georgia (country) in Greece
Expatriate sportspeople from Georgia (country) in Australia
Expatriate soccer players in Australia
A-League Men players